Vitaly Husseynovich Doguzhiyev (Yenakiyevo, 25 December 1935 – Moscow, 3 October 2016) was a Soviet official appointed as the First Deputy Prime Minister of the Cabinet of Ministers in 1991. Together with Vladimir Velichko, he was the last official on this position before the dissolution of the Soviet Union.

Life and career
He graduated from the Dnipropetrovsk University in 1958.

During the events of August 19-22, 1991, due to the illness of the USSR Prime Minister Valentin Pavlov, Doguzhiev was temporarily assigned the duties of the head of government. On August 28, the functions of the government of the Soviet Union were entrusted to the Committee on the Operational Management of the Soviet economy (COMSE) led by Ivan Silayev.

References

Sources 
Vitaly Doguzhiyev at WarHeroes.ru 

1935 births
2016 deaths
People from Donetsk Oblast
People's commissars and ministers of the Soviet Union
Central Committee of the Communist Party of the Soviet Union members
Russian communists
Recipients of the Order of Lenin
Recipients of the USSR State Prize
Heroes of Socialist Labour
Heads of government of the Soviet Union
Oles Honchar Dnipro National University alumni